George Bates Nichols Tower (1834–1889) was an American civil and mechanical engineer and Union naval officer during the American Civil War. He was also a Chandler Instructor in civil engineering at Dartmouth College.

In 1874, he wrote Instructions on Modern American Bridge Building.

References

External links
 
 
 Making of America page images of Instructions on Modern American Bridge Building

1834 births
1889 deaths
American civil engineers
Dartmouth College faculty
Union Navy officers